Harsewinkel is a town in Gütersloh District in the state of North Rhine-Westphalia, Germany. It lies on the river Ems, some 15 km north-west of Gütersloh.

It is the home and domicile of Europe's leading combine harvester manufacturer CLAAS, which is a major employer in the town.

Notable people
 Josef Homeyer (1929–2010), Roman Catholic bishop
 Adrian Wewer, Church architect in the United States
 Johann Christoph Rincklake, painter

References